Lenz may refer to:

Places
 Lenasia, Gauteng Province, South Africa, a township often called Lenz
 Lantsch/Lenz, Canton of Grisons, Switzerland, a municipality
 Lenz, Hood River County, Oregon, an unincorporated community
 Lenz, Klamath County, Oregon, an unincorporated community
 Lenz Island, Saskatchewan, Canada
 Lents (crater), a lunar crater labeled Lenz on some maps

Other uses
 Lenz (surname), including a list of people with the name
 Lenz (fragment), literary fragment by Georg Büchner
 Lenz Field, a baseball and softball complex in Jacksonville, Illinois

See also
 Lenz's law, in field electromagnetism
 Lentz
 Cenani Lenz syndactylism, congenital malformation syndrome
 Lenz microphthalmia syndrome, a rare inherited disorder
 Laplace–Runge–Lenz vector, a vector in classical mechanics